Śliwa or Sliwa may refer to:

People
Bogdan Śliwa (1922–2003), Polish chess master
Curtis Sliwa (born 1954), American anti-crime activist
Izabela Sliwa (born 1990), Polish volleyball player
Lisa Sliwa, the former name of Lisa Evers (born 1953), American journalist and ex-wife of Curtis Sliwa
Magdalena Śliwa (born 1969), Polish volleyball player
Maciej Śliwa (born 2001), Polish footballer 
Stefan Śliwa (1898–1964), Polish footballer
Warda Daniel Sliwa (born 1941), Catholicos-Patriarch of the Assyrian Church of the East

Place
Śliwa, Warmian-Masurian Voivodeship, Poland

See also
 J.P. Śliwa, the third solo album by Polish rock singer Piotr Rogucki
 

Polish-language surnames